Heidi Kasama is an American politician, serving in the Nevada State Assembly for District 2. A member of the Republican Party, Kasama was born New York, Kasama now resides in Las Vegas.

References

Republican Party members of the Nevada Assembly
21st-century American politicians
Living people
1959 births